Looner can refer to:

Loneer (band), a pop rock band
Looner, a person with a balloon fetish